The men's lightweight quadruple sculls competition at the 2014 Asian Games in Chungju, South Korea was held from 21 September to 25 September at the Tangeum Lake International Rowing Center.

Schedule 
All times are Korea Standard Time (UTC+09:00)

Results

Heat 
 Qualification: 1 → Final A (FA), 2–4 → Repechage (R)

Heat 1

Heat 2

Repechage 
 Qualification: 1–4 → Final A (FA), 5–6 → Final B (FB)

Final

Final B

Final A

References

External links 
 

Rowing at the 2014 Asian Games